Galeopsomyia is a New World genus of hymenopteran insects of the family Eulophidae.

Species
The following species are included in Galeopsomyia:

Galeopsomyia compacta (Howard, 1897)
Galeopsomyia cupreus (Ashmead, 1894)
Galeopsomyia deilochus (Walker, 1839)
Galeopsomyia epidius (Walker, 1847)
Galeopsomyia fausta LaSalle, 1997
Galeopsomyia haemon (Walker, 1847)
Galeopsomyia nicaraguaensis (Cameron, 1904)
Galeopsomyia nigrocyanea (Ashmead, 1886)
Galeopsomyia persimilis (Ashmead, 1904)
Galeopsomyia scadius (Walker, 1843)
Galeopsomyia squamosa (Girault, 1917)
Galeopsomyia sulcata (Howard, 1897)
Galeopsomyia transcarinata (Gahan, 1919)
Galeopsomyia valerus (Walker, 1839)
Galeopsomyia viridicyanea (Ashmead, 1904)

References

Key to Nearctic eulophid genera 
Universal Chalcidoidea Database 

Eulophidae